The Campeonato Nacional de Futsal Feminino is the women's premier futsal league in Portugal. It is organised by the Portuguese Football Federation and, therefore, played under UEFA's rules.

It was created in the 2013–14 season, joining Portugal's 16 best teams, and is disputed in a regular phase divided in two geographic zones, North and South, followed by a second phase with a poule contested by the top-four teams in each zone. The remaining teams contest one relegation poule for each zone, with the two lower teams of each group being relegated to the regional leagues (distritais). Each season, four teams are promoted from the previous edition of the Taça Nacional de Futsal Feminino.

Between 1996 and 2013, the national champions were the winners of the Taça Nacional (then the only national women's competition), which was contested by the winners of the regional leagues. Benfica are the current Portuguese champions, having won five consecutive league titles.

Champions by year

Performance by club

References

External links
Official website

Women
Futsal competitions in Portugal
Sports leagues established in 2013
2013 establishments in Portugal
Portugal
Women's sports leagues in Portugal